Live in the Mix is the third album by American garage house producer Romanthony.  It was released by Distance Records on June 14, 1999.

Track listing
"Intro/DJ Intro"
"I Like It"
"Dance With Me"
"Good Times (Remix)"
"Party Times"
"Party Buckwild"
"Floorpiece"
"Under/Main"
"Beatrock"
"Bring da Beat Back"
"I Like It"
"Sommore"
"Down 4 U"
"Drifting Solidly [*]"

External links
[ allmusic Overview]

1999 albums
Romanthony albums